The lowveld suckermouth (Chiloglanis swierstrai) is a species of upside-down catfish native to Mozambique, South Africa, Eswatini and Zimbabwe where it occurs in the Limpopo, Pongola and Komati Rivers.  This species grows to a length of  SL.

References

Chiloglanis
Freshwater fish of Africa
Fish of Mozambique
Fish of Eswatini
Fish of Zimbabwe
Freshwater fish of South Africa
Fish described in 1931
Taxonomy articles created by Polbot